WGRF (96.9 MHz) is a commercial FM radio station in Buffalo, New York, branded as "97 Rock". The station is owned by Cumulus Media and has a radio format playing classic rock, mostly from the 1970s and 1980s. WGRF competes for classic rock listeners with WBUF 92.9 FM and cross-border rival 91.7 CIXL-FM.  The studios are in the eastside of Buffalo.

WGRF has an effective radiated power of 24,000 watts.  The transmitter is off Elmwood Avenue in Buffalo.  It uses a directional antenna to protect CHYM-FM in Kitchener, Ontario, which is on 96.7 MHz.

History

Beautiful music
WGRF started as the FM sister station to WGR 550 AM.  On , it signed on the air as WGR-FM.  At first, WGR-AM-FM mostly simulcast a full service, middle of the road (MOR) format of popular adult music, talk and news.  By the late 1960s, WGR-FM switched to beautiful music, playing quarter hour sweeps of soft, instrumental cover versions of popular songs.

Over the years, WGRF was owned by the Taft Television and Radio Company, Rich Communications, Mercury Radio Communications and Citadel Broadcasting, a forerunner to current owner Cumulus Media.  Mercury Radio separated WGRF from WGR AM in 1995 when it bought WGRF from Rich Communications, which in turn retained WGR until selling it to the Sinclair Broadcast Group two years later.

Top 40 and AOR
In 1973, the station became WGRQ with a Top 40 format known as "Super Q".  Its main competition was legendary Top 40 powerhouse WKBW 1520 AM.  Not all radios at the time had FM reception.  But WGRQ offered the hits in FM stereo.  Led by Program Director JJ Jordan, Station Manager William Austin, and a 24-hour live staff, the station shot to the top 4 in the crowded Buffalo market for about two years.  

In 1975, flipped to album rock, rebranding as "Q-FM 97", and then as "97 Rock WGRQ-FM".  The original "97 Rock" era featured Program Director and DJ John McGhan. By the early 1980s, the station had largely entrenched itself into a styling and format that came to be associated with the nascent classic rock format.

AC music and classic rock
On January 4, 1985, WGRQ dumped its rock format and shifted to an adult contemporary format as WRLT, firing all but two of the WGRQ airstaff. With the other rock station in Buffalo, 103.3 WPHD and its simulcast partner on 1400, maintaining a more modern focus (as it still does), a domino effect soon followed to fill the void for classic rock.  WHTT flipped to a "classic hits" format, and rimshot signal 107.7 began playing classic rock as WBYR.

On September 20, 1988, WRLT changed its call sign back to WGR-FM.  It switched to classic rock and rehired most of its former DJs under the legendary "97 Rock" name. (By the end of the year, WHTT and AM 1400 both changed to oldies, while WBYR flipped to beautiful music.  Three years later, WGR-FM changed its call letters to the current WGRF. The station staff and format have largely been unchanged ever since.

From 1999 to 2013, WGRF was the flagship station of the Buffalo Bills Radio Network.  Every game day, WGRF devoted hours to airing the game as well as pre-game and post-game shows.

WGRF streamed its programming on the Internet until 2002, when it became economically unfeasible for some stations to continue their streams given changes in licensing and royalty agreements. In March 2006, Citadel launched an initiative that provided for the streaming of many of Citadel's stations. WGRF was among the first commercial stations in Buffalo to resume streaming after the earlier changes.

Morning show changes
In December 2015, morning host Larry Norton retired from broadcasting.  He decided to devote his time to charity and ministry.

In April 2021, WGRF issued a mass firing eliminating the station's program director and the entire morning show, after co-host Rob Lederman had made off-color remarks on the show a month prior. Owner Cumulus Media brought over longtime WEDG morning hosts "Shredd and Ragan" to host WGRF's morning drive time show in August of that year.

References

External links
Official WGRF website

1970s Photos of 97 Rock jocks from Steve Cichon's staffannouncer.com

GRF
Cumulus Media radio stations
Classic rock radio stations in the United States
Radio stations established in 1959
1959 establishments in New York (state)
Taft Broadcasting